Everyday Is Like Sunday is a 2013 Canadian independent film directed by Pavan Moondi. It stars David Dineen-Porter, Coral Osborne and Adam Gurfinkel as twenty-something friends and roommates trying to come to terms with adulthood.

The film had a limited theatrical release in Canada on August 16, 2013, and was acquired for Canadian distribution by Mongrel Media in January 2014.

Cast

Release 
The film premiered to generally favorable reviews. Manori Ravindran for the National Post wrote "Millennial angst in gritty urban centres could warrant its own section in The New York Times. We’re poor, we’re jobless, we’re lonely, we get it. But there’s an honesty and whip smart humour to the micro-budget Everyday Is Like Sunday that separates it from similar fare. Exclaim!'s Kevin Scott praised the film as a "fiercely funny depiction of a specific brand of late 20s malaise."

References

External links 
 

2013 films
English-language Canadian films
Canadian comedy-drama films
Canadian independent films
2010s English-language films
2010s Canadian films